There are currently 900 permitted private satellite television channels in India .
Numerous regional channels are available throughout India, often distributed according to languages.

Lists

By video technology
4K
HD

By language
Assamese
Bengali
Bhojpuri
English
Gujarati
Hindi
Kannada
Konkani
Malayalam
Marathi
Meitei (Manipuri)
Odia
Punjabi
Tamil
Telugu
Urdu

By category
News

See also
Lists of global television channels
Lists of global television networks

References

 
Indian